Zindagi is a 1940 Indian film, directed by Pramathesh Barua and produced by Birendranath Sircar. Starring K. L. Saigal, Jamuna Barua, Pahari Sanyal, Shyam Laha, Sitara Devi, and Nemo, it revolves around Ratan, an unemployed university graduate, and his relationship with Shrimati, who is on the run from her cruel husband.

Earning ₹5.5 million net (valued at about ₹39.78 crore in 2009), Zindagi was the highest grossing Indian film at the time of its release, before its record was broken by Khazanchi in 1941.

The film has been described as one of Barua's "most beautiful films, and his last for New Theatres". It was the last film by Barua for New Theatres. Barua later married Jamuna as his second wife. This film was remade into Bengali as Priyo Bandhabi in 1943 directed By Soumen Mukherjee. No copy of the film is known to exist, making it a lost film.

Plot
Ratan, an unemployed graduate, who works as a gambler encounters an unnamed women, whom he addresses as Shrimati. Shrimati, who has escaped from her brutal husband, teams up with Ratan and they together pretend to run a charitable trust, collecting money from people in the name of donations. The duo buy an apartment and live together.

Shrimati receives news of her father's death and learn that she is the heir to his wealth. A new Shrimati shuns all forms of corrupt ways of life and starts to do good deeds as a redemption for her sins. She employs Ratan as a tutor to an orphaned girl Lakhia. Ratan realizes that he cannot live without Shrimati and approaches her. Shrimati, who feels that she must pay for her sins, rejects Ratan.

A heartbroken Ratan leaves Lakhia in the care of Shrimati and returns to his old life. Shrimati gives her fortune to a now-grown Lakhia and withdraws from worldly pleasures, awaiting death.  The two lovers are shown to have died and reunited in afterlife.

Cast
Credits adapted from the films's pressbook:
 Saigal as Ratan, The Vagabond 
 Pahari Sanyal as Ratan's friend
 Asalata as Ratan's friends's mistress
 Jamuna as Mrs. X. (Shrimati)
 Sham Laha as Shrimati's husband
 Nemo as Shrimati's father
 Sitara as Shrimati's sister
 Dhruba Kumar Shrimati's officer
 Bikram Kapoor	as Shrimati's lawyer
 Rajnirani as Shrimati's companion
 Manorama as Lakhia, Shrimati's mother-in-law
 Ramkumari as Shrimati's sister-in-law
The Sonthal Dancers
 Brajabasi, Lakhmi, Kalo & the crowd

Promotional activities
An advertisement of Zindagi compares Gothe and Voltaire's notions of life with that of Baura's.

Release

Critical reception
Zindagi generally received positive reviews for critics.
The Bombay Chronicle lauded the film for Pankaj Mullick's "divine music", two songs of Segal that are "the soul of melody and pathos," the "cynical" humour of the first half of the film and the "subtle, heart-wrenching" emotionalism of the second half. They also praised the "haunting" performance of Jamuna. Filmindia called the film an "all smoke" and described it as generally "too intellectual" for the average audience. Bhagwan Das Garga writes, "The plot is slight but Barua's nuanced characterization and wealth of observation makes it a richly rewarding work."

Controversies
In a frame sequence of the 1939 film Aadmi by V. Shantaram, which was simultaneously released along with Zindagi, the romantic "pessimism" of Barua was caricatured. According to Garga, this incident provided enough "grist" for the news media. An unnamed Gujarati weekly remarked, "Shantaram's eye is on life, Barua's on death." Jamil Ansari, a critic, strongly defended Zindagi. Khwaja Ahmad Abbas compared the two films and wrote:

Music
The music composer was Pankaj Mullick with lyrics by Kidar Sharma and Arzu Lucknavi. One of the memorable songs from the film was "So Ja Rajkumari Soja". This lullaby was made famous in this film.

All songs are sung by K. L. Saigal.

References

External links
 

1940 films
1940s Hindi-language films
Indian black-and-white films
Indian drama films
1940 drama films
1940 lost films
Lost drama films
Lost Indian films
Hindi-language drama films
Films directed by Pramathesh Barua
Films scored by Pankaj Mullick